Scaloppine (plural and diminutive of scaloppa—a small scallop, i.e., a thinly sliced cut of meat; in English usage scaloppini; sometimes scallopini) is a type of Italian dish that comes in many forms.  It consists of thinly sliced meat, most often beef, veal, or chicken, that is dredged in wheat flour and sautéed in one of a variety of reduction sauces.

The sauce accompanying scaloppine can come in many varieties according to regional gastronomic traditions.  Popular variations include tomato-wine reduction; scaloppine al limone or piccata, which denotes a caper-and-lemon sauce; scaloppine ai funghi, a mushroom-wine reduction; and pizzaiola, a pizza-style tomato sauce.

Etymology 
The term 'escalope' derives from the French escalope. The untranslated term was used until the beginning of the twentieth century in the publications of various Italian gastronomes such as Giovanni Vialardi and Ada Boni.

See also
 Carne pizzaiola
 Chicken marsala
 List of veal dishes
 Piccata
 Saltimbocca

References

External links
 Scallopini chicken Video Recipe

Beef dishes
Italian chicken dishes
Italian cuisine
Veal dishes